On June 11, 1945, Florida's state roads were renumbered. The old system numbered routes in the order they were legislated, while the new system used a grid.

Notes

See also
Florida State Roads
Pre-1945 Florida State Roads

 
Florida State Road Renumbering, 1945
Florida State Road Renumbering, 1945
History of transportation in Florida
Renumbering
Highway renumbering in the United States